is a Japanese actor, director, and screenwriter. He has written several screenplay adaptations of manga series including Tokyo Zombie, Ichi The Killer, and Gozu.  He also directed Miss Boys about cross-dressing schoolboys. In the West, he played Charlie Brown in Quentin Tarantino's 2003 film Kill Bill: Volume 1.

Filmography

References

External links
 

1964 births
Living people
Japanese male film actors
Japanese film directors
Japanese screenwriters